Robert Gibson (13 March 1821 – 25 September 1875) was an English first-class cricketer active 1855–58 who played for Nottinghamshire. He was born in Nottingham; died in Old Radford.

References

1821 births
1875 deaths
English cricketers
Nottinghamshire cricketers
North v South cricketers
All-England Eleven cricketers